The Belgian Draught, is a Belgian breed of draught horse. It originates from the Brabant region of modern Belgium, and is one of the strongest of the heavy breeds. The breed associations are the Société Royale Le Cheval de Trait Belge/ Koninklijke Maatschappij van het Belgisch Trekpaard and the Eleveurs Wallons du Cheval de Trait Belge/ Vlaamse Fokkers van het Belgisch Trekpaard.

History 

Closely related breeds include the Trait du Nord and Nederlands Trekpaard.

Characteristics

Genetic Diversity 
The Belgian Draught horse has been identified as having an intermediate level of genetic diversity, and found to have relatively low levels of inbreeding. However due to low founder diversity, the breed is identified as likely to have a potential compromise of genetic diversity in future generations.

Uses

References

Horse breeds
Horse breeds originating in Belgium